The Biathlon World Championships 2021 took place in Pokljuka, Slovenia, from 9 to 21 February 2021.

Host selection
On 4 September 2016, Tyumen won the voting (25 votes) during the 12th IBU Congress in Chisinau in Moldova over Pokljuka in Slovenia (13 votes) and Nové Město na Moravě in the Czech Republic (11 votes). Also Antholz-Anterselva, Italy, withdrew their bid for 2021 championships before the vote took place due to winning of an election for the host of the 2020 event.

Just before the Biathlon World Championships 2017 in Hochfilzen, Austria, IBU forced Russia to give back rights due to the doping scandal, for revote process after 2018 Winter Olympics in Pyeongchang, Republic of Korea.

On 9 September 2018, during the IBU Congress, Pokljuka was named the 2021 event host city without alternative with 49–1 votes.

Russia doping ban

On 9 December 2019, the World Anti-Doping Agency (WADA) banned Russia from all international sport for a period of four years, after the Russian government was found to have tampered with laboratory data that it provided to WADA in January 2019 as a condition of the Russian Anti-Doping Agency being reinstated. As a result of the ban, WADA plans to allow individually cleared Russian athletes to take part in the 2021-2022 World Championships and 2022 Winter Olympics under a neutral banner, as instigated at the 2018 Winter Olympics, but they will not be permitted to compete in team sports. The title of the neutral banner has yet to be determined; WADA Compliance Review Committee head Jonathan Taylor stated that the IOC would not be able to use "Olympic Athletes from Russia" (OAR) as it did in 2018, emphasizing that neutral athletes cannot be portrayed as representing a specific country. Russia later filed an appeal to the Court of Arbitration for Sport (CAS) against the WADA decision. The Court of Arbitration for Sport, on review of Russia's appeal of its case from WADA, ruled on 17 December 2020 to reduce the penalty that WADA had placed. Instead of banning Russia from sporting events, the ruling allowed Russia to participate at the Olympics and other international events, but for a period of two years, the team cannot use the Russian name, flag, or anthem and must present themselves as "Neutral Athlete" or "Neutral Team". The ruling does allow for team uniforms to display "Russia" on the uniform as well as the use of the Russian flag colors within the uniform's design, although the name should be up to equal predominance as the "Neutral Athlete/Team" designation.

Biathletes of the Russian national team perform at the tournament under the monochrome flag of the Russian Biathlon Union (RBU) as part of the RBU team. However, the IBU banned the use of the decoding of the abbreviation - the Russian Biathlon Union. Also, Russian biathletes are prohibited from using national symbols in social networks during the World Cup.

Schedule
All times are local (UTC+1).

Medal summary

Medal table

Top athletes
All athletes with two or more medals.

Men

Women

Mixed

Participating countries
37 nations competed.

 
 
 
 
 
 
 
 
 
 
 
 
 
 
 
 
 
 
 
 
 
 
 
 
 
 
 
  RBU

References

External links
Official website

 
2021
2021 in biathlon
2021 in Slovenian sport
International sports competitions hosted by Slovenia
Biathlon competitions in Slovenia
February 2021 sports events in Europe